Naturama was a widescreen movie technique used by Republic Pictures, during the 1950s.

Films produced in Naturama format

The Maverick Queen (1956)
Juvenile Jungle (1956)
Lisbon (1956)
Accused of Murder (1956)
Thunder Over Arizona (1956)
Affair in Reno (1957)
The Crooked Circle (1957)
Duel at Apache Wells (1957)
Hell's Crossroads (1957)
The Wayward Girl (1957)
Young and Wild (1958)
Man or Gun (1958)
The Man Who Died Twice (1958)
 The Notorious Mr. Monks (1958)
No Place to Land (1958)
Plunderers of Painted Flats (1959)

References
Naturama at Wide Screen Museum

External links
Naturama at Wide Screen Museum

Motion picture film formats

References